A boat is a nautical craft of modest size.

Boat may also refer to:

Water travel
 Ship, a larger water vessel
 Submarine, a vessel capable of underwater travel
 The members of a crew in the sport of rowing

Organisations and companies 

 Brownsea Open Air Theatre, a theatre company in Dorset, England
 boAt , Indian wearables brand.

Music
 BOAT, an American indie rock band

Films
 Boat (2007 film), a 2007 short film directed by David Lynch
 Boat (2009 film), a Japanese-South Korean film
 Das Boot, German for The Boat, a 1981 feature film directed by Wolfgang Petersen, adapted from a novel of the same name by Lothar-Günther Buchheim.
 "The Boat" (song), single release of the title theme to the Wolfgang Petersen film, in Germany released as "Das Boot"
 The Boat (1921 film), a 1921 film starring Buster Keaton

People
 Billy Boat, American racecar driver
 Chad Boat, son of Billy
 Dave Boat, American voice actor

Other uses
As a part of some placenames where there is or was a rowing boat used as a ferry
 Boat, Kentucky, an unincorporated community
 Boat Branch, a stream in Tennessee
 BOAT, or Byway Open to All Traffic in England & Wales
 Boat, a slang term shortened from the phrase Fresh off the boat for newly arrived immigrants
 Boat conformation, a conformation of cyclohexane
 Billy Boat Motorsports
 Sauce boat, a type of pitcher
 Bug Out Altoids Tin, a type of miniature survival kit
 Full house (poker), a type of poker hand
 Boat, a trade reporting platform owned by Markit Group Limited
 Slang for "face" in cockney rhyming slang
 The Boat refers to the Vernon C. Bain Correctional Center which is a floating barge turned Prison in New York City.
 The Boats was an ancient method of execution also known as scaphism.
 Boat (drawing), some geometric patterns that introduced by Hamid Naderi Yeganeh
 Boat, a container for incense used in Christian liturgies.
 Boat, a still life in Conway's Game of Life

See also
 The Boat (disambiguation)
 Ship (disambiguation)